Telengit-Sortogoy (Teleñit-Sarı Tokoy) is a rural locality (a selo) and the administrative centre of Telengit-Sortogoysky Rural Settlement of Kosh-Agachsky District, the Altai Republic, Russia. The population was 605 as of 2016. There are 8 streets.

Geography 
Telengit-Sortogoy is located in the south-east of the Altai Republic, in the north of the central part of the Kosh-Agach region, 9 km northeast of Kosh-Agach (the district's administrative centre) by road. Kosh-Agach is the nearest rural locality.

References 

Rural localities in Kosh-Agachsky District